100 People, 100 Songs was a 2014 South Korean singing competition program presented by Kim Sung-joo, Jang Yun-jeong and Moon Hee-joon. It aired on JTBC from October 31, 2014 to September 27, 2015.

Format
There are a total of 100 people in the audience as there are a total of 100 songs that are each given a number. When a contestant chooses a number, she/he has to sing the song associated with that number. The song starts off with a selected member of the audience singing the beginning of the song before the contestant continues singing the song with the lyrics jumbled up on the screen. If the contestant manages to sing the song correctly and clears the screen, the screen shows "CLEAR" and they win that round. When competing as a duo, the person who gets the song incorrectly ("FAIL") will eliminate his/her partner from competing, then the remaining member must pass the one-chance revival test before continuing on.

Notable contestants
 N (VIXX)
 Ken (VIXX)
 Wendy (Red Velvet)
 Seulgi (Red Velvet)
 Sandeul (B1A4)
 Solji (EXID)
 Hani (EXID)
 Minah (Girl's Day)
 K.Will
 Lee Tae-il (Block B)
 Huh Gak
 Kim Seul-gi
 Min Kyung-hoon (Buzz)
 Jang Yoon-jeong
 Soyou (Sistar)
 Changmin (2AM)
 Jinwoon (2AM)
 Kyuhyun (Super Junior)
 Kim Tae-woo
 Park Ji-min (15&)
 Min (Miss A)
 Kim Yeon-ji
 Son Seung-yeon
 Choa (AOA)
 Baek A-yeon
 Kim Feel
 DIA
 Wheein (Mamamoo)
 Hwasa (Mamamoo)
Chunji (Teen Top)
Lizzy (After School)
Raina (After School)

Broadcast History

References

External links
Official website 

2014 South Korean television series debuts
2015 South Korean television series endings
Korean-language television shows
JTBC original programming
South Korean variety television shows
South Korean music television shows
Music competitions in South Korea